Congleton is an unincorporated community in Pitt County, in the U.S. state of North Carolina.

History
James R. Congleton was a local postmaster.

References

Unincorporated communities in Pitt County, North Carolina
Unincorporated communities in North Carolina